Yap Cheng Wen (born 4 January 1995) is a Malaysian badminton player. In 2016, she won the Scottish Open tournament in the women's doubles event partnered with Lim Yin Loo.

Achievements

Southeast Asian Games 
Women's doubles

BWF World Tour (1 title, 1 runner-up) 
The BWF World Tour, which was announced on 19 March 2017 and implemented in 2018, is a series of elite badminton tournaments sanctioned by the Badminton World Federation (BWF). The BWF World Tour is divided into levels of World Tour Finals, Super 1000, Super 750, Super 500, Super 300 (part of the HSBC World Tour), and the BWF Tour Super 100.

Women's doubles

BWF Grand Prix (1 title) 
The BWF Grand Prix had two levels, the Grand Prix and Grand Prix Gold. It was a series of badminton tournaments sanctioned by the Badminton World Federation (BWF) and played between 2007 and 2017.

Women's doubles

  BWF Grand Prix Gold tournament
  BWF Grand Prix tournament

BWF International Challenge/Series (2 titles, 5 runners-up) 
Women's doubles

  BWF International Challenge tournament
  BWF International Series tournament

References

External links 
 BAM Talent team
 

1995 births
Living people
People from Malacca
Malaysian sportspeople of Chinese descent
Malaysian female badminton players
Competitors at the 2019 Southeast Asian Games
Southeast Asian Games bronze medalists for Malaysia
Southeast Asian Games medalists in badminton
21st-century Malaysian women